The 2018 Newcastle-under-Lyme Borough Council election took place on 3 May 2018 to elect members of Newcastle-under-Lyme Borough Council in England. It was held on the same day as other local elections.

Newcastle-under-Lyme Borough Council decided in November 2015 to move to whole council elections, starting from this election.

Election summary

Candidates

Audley

Bradwell

Clayton

Crackley and Red Street

Cross Heath

Holditch and Chesterton

Keele

Kidsgrove and Ravenscliffe

Knutton

Loggerheads

Madeley and Betley

Maer and Whitmore

May Bank

Newchapel and Mow Cop

Silverdale

Talke and Butt Lane

Thistleberry

Town

Westbury Park and Northwood

Westlands

Wolstanton

By-elections

References

2018
2018 English local elections
2010s in Staffordshire